Loading was a short-lived Brazilian television network. Launched in December 2020, initially had programming focused on attractions about pop and geek cultures, series, movies, animations and esports. Its activities were discontinued in May 2021, no longer on air with unpublished productions. Headquartered in São Paulo, capital of the homonymous state, its concessions and structure belong to entrepreneurs José Roberto Garcia and Paulo Sérgio Garcia.

History 
The channel is the brainchild of a group of entrepreneurs led by José Roberto Garcia and Paulo Sérgio Garcia, owners of Kalunga, and José Roberto Maluf, owner of Spring Comunicação and current president of TV Cultura. The Loading project was first announced in October 2020 as a channel with content aimed at pop, geek and Asian cultures, among others. Its licenses and physical structure were inherited from MTV Brasil, whose broadcasts ended in 2013, being replaced by Ideal TV and subsequently acquired in a public auction after a long process of officializing the sale, completed in 2014. Its physical structure consists of a building located in the Sumaré neighborhood (São Paulo), which were the headquarters of the defunct TV Tupi in the 1970s.

In an interview, Loading CEO Thiago Garcia said the channel would be an entertainment solution for a portion of the Brazilian population that does not have access to content via streaming.

At 6 p.m. on December 1, 2020, the website of the channel appeared, at the end of a mysterious countdown, a video in which a character simulating a hacker, under the pseudonym "Mr. 52X", announces that the channel will open on December 7 at 8:30 p.m.

On December 2, the channel announced a partnership with Sony Pictures Entertainment to allow the showing of more than 100 titles, including films, television series and anime. On the same day, it was announcedafter an agreement with the Valdemiro Santiago's Rede Mundialthat Ideal TV's signal would continue through the analog signals from the Star One C2 and SES-6 satellites.

On December 3 at 6 p.m., a live video of the channel is posted on its website for the public to follow the start of its operations over the internet. At the same time, a list of cities with the network's digital terrestrial signal was made available, as well as the channel numbers on pay-TV. At 7:59 p.m. on the same day, Ideal TV's terrestrial and subscription TV signals were interrupted and just over a minute later, the character "Mr.52x" appears directly from the station's switcher, speaking to viewers against the recent directions of entertainment on Brazilian terrestrial TV and the control of social media algorithms over the public, followed by the screening of the first episode of the anime Saint Seiya: The Lost Canvas, with a countdown to the launch of the station in the upper right hand corner. After showing the episode, a "static" sign, inspired by the old Indian-head test pattern, with the message "Please stand by" and the Japanese word  in the center of the screen, alternating randomly for scenes of a few seconds starring the "hacker".

On December 4, the channel signed a deal with Crunchyroll for the exclusive broadcast of anime in prime time, comprising slots between 6 p.m. and 1 a.m.

On December 7 at 8:28 p.m., after a sneak premiere of an episode of Transformers: Cyberverse the channel officially began its launch nationwide after its pre-launch phase in some areas.

Controversies

Dismissal of the esports staff 
On December 11, 2020, less than a week after its debut, Loading goes through its first internal problems with the dismissal of its entire eSports staff, including newsroom journalists and presenters Barbara Gutierrez and Chandy Teixeira, from the Metagaming show. Professionals disconnected from the channel claimed in their social media profiles that the reason would be "editorial misalignment", implying that they would have been subject to censorship. According to an article published by The Esports Observer, the complaints started due to the dissatisfaction of Loading's management team with the content presented in the first two editions of Metagaming. At the premiere, on December 7, the show aired an investigative report on a possible fraud scheme related to a fundraising campaign led by a player on Twitch, which they called "Sparda case". Dissatisfied with the material, the managers would have warned the show's production that the channel's purpose was to be "a happy place, without controversial subjects". Despite this, in the next episode of the show, (aired on December 8, the last one that aired) it aired a addressing the departure of the Vivo Keyd team from the Brazilian Championship of League of Legends (CBLoL), giving a negative highlight for Riot Games, developer of the event, due to the announcement of the company Oi (direct competitor of Vivo) as a new sponsor.

In reaction to the report, Loading's management dismissed eSports editor-in-chief Vicenzzo Mandetta the following day (December 10) and reinforced its staff the idea of producing only positive news, following a channel's "positive agenda", forbidding approaches to controversial subjects or even reports that denounced and discussed sexism or discrimination in electronic sports. Uncomfortable with the decision, the Metagaming staff complained about censorship and sent a list of demands to the management, requesting freedom of speech and production of their material "with the seriousness the situations required", demands that were rejected. This attitude caused the entire staff of 12 journalists to agree to resign the next day, however, the management of Loading ended up anticipating this decision and dismissed the professionals. After the repercussion of the case in the specialized press, Loading said in a statement that the Metagaming show would be reformulated "due to the misalignment between Loading's positioning, focused on entertainment, and the show's editorial team [...]" and that they would seek to "deliver content that further enhances Esports, but with an editorial line focused on entertainment".

On the same day, an article published by the website Splash found that Loading had not yet signed a contract with the dismissed professionals and with others who were still at the TV station. The company tried to sign the contracts in a hurry, so that the termination would be made official in the sequence, but the staff refused. Because of this, the professionals had not yet received transportation vouchers, meal vouchers and health insurance. Internally, the TV station justifies itself by saying that it is a "startup still in its first steps" and that it did not want to "beat partners". Similar statements were also collected in The Esports Observer article, where they reported difficulties in producing material with old equipment that were still the same used by MTV Brasil, "with technology from 20 years ago and not relying even on basic software for TV production". The text claims that due to this pressure, employees even cried before the first Metagaming went live.

In solidarity with the team of journalists, the commentators of the Loading Esports League also announced their resignation. The Metagaming show episode that would be shown on the day was replaced by reruns of Multiverso.

References

External links 
  (out of date)

Portuguese-language television networks
Defunct television channels in Brazil
Television channels and stations established in 2020
Television channels and stations disestablished in 2021
2020 establishments in Brazil
Anime television
Television controversies in Brazil